Paul Connolly (born 1 November 1990) is a cricketer from Jersey. He played in the 2011 ICC World Cricket League Division Six tournament.

References

External links
 

1990 births
Living people
Jersey cricketers
People from Saint Helier